The Rhode Island Supreme Court was created in 1747 and used the title of Superior Court of Judicature, Court of Assize, and General Gaol Delivery.  When established, the court consisted of a Chief Justice and four Associate Justices (for a list of the Associate Justices, see List of the Justices of the Rhode Island Supreme Court)  Following are the Chief Justices from  1747 to the present:

Colonial 

Gideon Cornell, May 1747 – January 1749
Joshua Babcock, January 1749 – May 1751
Stephen Hopkins, May 1751 – May 1755, Signer of the Declaration of Independence
Francis Willet, May 1755 – August 1755
Stephen Hopkins, August 1755 – May 1756
John Gardner, May 1756 – May 1761
Samuel Ward, May 1761 – May 1762
Jeremiah Niles, May 1762 – June 1762
Joseph Russell, June 1762 – August 1763
Joshua Babcock, August 1763 – October 1763
John Banister, October 1763 – February 1764
John Cole, February 1764 – May 1765
Joseph Russell, May 1765 – June 1767
James Helme, June 1767 – May 1768
Joseph Russell, May 1768 – June 1769
James Helme, June 1769 – June 1770
Stephen Hopkins, June 1770 – October 1775
John Cooke, October 1775 – August 1776

State 

Metcalf Bowler, August 1776 – February 1777
William Greene, February 1777 – May 1778
Shearjashub Bourn, May 1778 – May 1781
Paul Mumford, May 1781 – June 1785
William Ellery, June 1785 – May 1786, signer of Declaration of Independence
Paul Mumford, May 1786 – June 1788
Othniel Gorton, June 1788 – May 1791
Daniel Owen, May 1791 – June 1795

In 1799, the name was changed to the Supreme Judicial Court:
Peleg Arnold, June 1795 – June 1809
Thomas Arnold, 1809 – 1810
Peleg Arnold, 1810 – 1812
Daniel Lyman, 1812 – 1816
James Burrill, Jr., 1816 – 1817
Tristam Burges, 1817 – 1818
James Fenner, 1819 – 1819
Isaac Wilbour, 1819 – 1827
Samuel Eddy, 1827 – 1835
Job Durfee, 1835 – 1843

In 1843, the name was changed to the Supreme Court:
Job Durfee, 1843 – 1848
Richard W. Green, 1848 – 1854
William R. Staples, 1854 – 1856
Samuel Ames, 1856 – 1866
Charles S. Bradley, 1866 – 1868
George A. Brayton, 1868 – 1875
Thomas Durfee, 1875 – 1891
Charles Matteson, 1891 – 1900
John H. Stiness, 1900 – 1903
Pardon E. Tillinghast, 1904 – 1905
William W. Douglas, 1905 – 1908
Edward C. Dubois, 1909 – 1913
Clarke H. Johnson, 1913 – 1917
Christopher F. Parkhurst, 1917 – 1920
William A. Sweetland, 1920 – 1929
Charles F. Stearns, 1929 – 1935
Edmund W. Flynn, 1935 – 1957
Francis B. Condon, 1958 – 1965
Thomas H. Roberts, 1966 – 1976
Joseph A. Bevilacqua, Sr., 1976 – 1986
Thomas F. Fay, 1986 – 1993
Joseph R. Weisberger, 1993 – 2001
Frank J. Williams, 2001 – 2008
Paul Suttell, 2009 – present

See also 
List of the Justices of the Rhode Island Supreme Court

References

Bibliography 

Chief Justices of the Rhode Island Supreme Court
Pre-statehood history of Rhode Island
People of colonial Rhode Island
Rhode Island in the American Revolution
Chief justices